Kolga is a village in Nõo Parish, Tartu County in eastern Estonia. It is located 103 mi or 167 km south-east of Tallinn.

References

 

Villages in Tartu County